Clear Creek/Federal station (sometimes stylized as Clear Creek•Federal) is a Regional Transportation District (RTD) commuter rail station on the G Line located in the unincorporated community of Berkley, Colorado between Denver Union Station and Wheat Ridge,  on an embanked section of track immediately east of Federal Boulevard. Clear Creek/Federal station is the third station outbound on the Gold Line from Denver Union Station and also includes three bus bays and a 283-stall park and ride facility. The station opened on April 26, 2019.

During early planning for the station, Adams County officials proposed moving the station to the west side of Federal Boulevard to benefit a real estate developer, while RTD's preferred east location would require industrial cleanup but would kickstart revitalization of the area.

The station features the largest piece of public art to be commissioned by RTD: Addison Karl's  hand-painted mural "Doradus", along the embanked wall.

References

Railway stations in the United States opened in 2019
RTD commuter rail stations
2019 establishments in Colorado